Tetratricopeptide repeat protein 39B is a protein that in humans is encoded by the TTC39B gene. TTC39B is also known as C9orf52 or FLJ33868. The main feature within tetratricopeptide repeat 39B is the domain of unknown function 3808 (DUF3808), spanning the majority of the protein.

Gene 

The gene for TTC39B is located on the short arm of the ninth chromosome at 9p22.3. The genomic DNA is 136,517 bases long, consists of 39 introns and 20 exons, and is on the minus strand. The mRNA has a length of 3,276 bases. TTC39B is surrounded by LOC100419056, a chloride channel, voltage-sensitive 3 pseudogene.

Function 

TTC39B is expected to have a molecular binding function as well as a role in lipid regulation; the phenotype as well as the function in vivo is unknown.

Homology and evolution

Paralogs 

There are two known paralogs for TTC39B: TTC39A and TTC39C. TTC39A has two splice isoforms and TTC39C has three splice isoforms.

TTC39A has been tested for association to diseases like breast neoplasms and is expected to have molecular binding function and localizes in various compartments (extracellular space, membrane, nucleus).

TTC39C is expected to localize in cytoplasm. No phenotype has been discovered, and the gene's in vivo function is unknown.

Orthologs

Distant homologs

Phylogeny 

TTC39B is conserved in organisms from human to platyhelminthes and is not conserved in yeast and fungi.

Protein 

The TTC39B gene has five different transcript variants, each coding for a different protein. This article focuses on tetratricopeptide repeat protein 39B isoform 1, the longest of all of the proteins. When translated, the TTC39B protein is composed of 682 amino acids and has a molecular weight of 76,955.64 kDa. The isoelectric point of the protein is 7.16 pH.

Conservation 

Close Orthologs:

Distant Orthologs:

Domains and motifs 

The Domain of Unknown Function 3808 (DUF3808) domain is conserved from fungi to humans and is currently has an unknown function. It is located from amino acid 142 until 568 (a length of 427 amino acids). Proteins of this family also contain a TPR_2 domain at their C-terminus, which also has an unknown function.

Another conserved domain in the TTC39B protein is the TPR_12 tetratricopeptide repeat. It is located from amino acid 600 until 658 (a length of 59 amino acids). The TPR domains are found in many proteins that facilitate specific interactions with a partner protein. Three-dimensional structural data have shown that a TPR region forms two antiparallel alpha-helices. TPR motifs that are arranged one in front of another create a right-handed helical structure with an amphipathic channel which could possibly accommodate the complementary region of a target protein. Most TPR-containing proteins are associated with multiprotein complexes, and there is extensive evidence indicating that TPR motifs are important to the functioning of chaperone, cell-cycle, transcription, and protein transport complexes. Two more TPR domains are found in the TTC39B protein: TPR1 which spans from amino acids 393 to 426 (34 amino acids long) and TPR2 which spans from amino acids 626 to 659 (also 34 amino acids long).

TTC39B contains three transmembrane regions, all located within the DUF3808 region. Since there are three transmembrane regions, the N-terminus and C-terminus of the protein will be on opposite sides of the plasma membrane.

Post-translational modifications 

Phosphorylation Sites:

Probability of Sumoylation Sites  (bolded):

There is one possible N-glycosylation site at amino acid 391, however, since the TTC39B protein does not contain a signal peptide, it is unlikely that this glycosylation actually occurs.

Secondary structure 

According to an analysis of the secondary protein structure, TTC39B is most likely to be expressed in the endoplasmic reticulum, mitochondria, and Golgi apparatus.

Tertiary and quaternary structure 

The TTC39B protein folds into an alpha-alpha super helix. 40% of its structure matches with d1w3ba, the superhelical domain of o-linked GlcNAc transferase. O-GlcNAc couples metabolic status to the regulation of a wide variety of cellular signaling pathways by acting as a nutrient sensor.

Expression

Promoter and transcription start site 

The promoter for TTC39B starts at base pair 15,307,109 and ends at base pair 15,307,858. It has a length of 750 base pairs. The transcription start site for TTC39B protein isoform 1 is located from base pairs 15,307,340 to 15,307,389 and has a length of 50 bp.

Expression profile 

TTC39B is well expressed in muscles, internal organs, secretory organs, reproductive organs, the immune system, and the nervous system. TTC39B is expressed in a multitude of tissues: testis, lung, islets of langerhans, pancreas, kidney, pooled germ cell tumors, breast carcinoma, etc.

Transcript variants 

There are five different transcript variants for the TTC39B gene. Isoform 1 is the longest transcript and encodes the longest isoform. Isoform 2 uses an alternate in-frame splice site in the central coding region, compared to variant 1, which results in a shorter protein. Isoform 3 and 4 have multiple differences in the central coding region but maintain the reading frame compared to isoform 1. Isoform 5 differs in the 5' UTR and has multiple coding region differences, compared to variant 1. These differences cause translation initiation at an in-frame downstream AUG and results in isoform 5 having a shorter N-terminus compared to isoform 1.

Interacting proteins

Binding transcription factors 

Transcription Factor Binding Sites:

Cellular Proteins 

TTC39B interacts with ubiquitin C (UBC), a polyubiquitin precursor. Conjugation of ubiquitin monomers or polymers leads to different effects within a cell. Ubiquitination has been associated with protein degradation, DNA repair, cell cycle regulation, kinase modification, endocytosis, and regulation of other cell signaling pathways.

Clinical significance

Disease association 

On a locus on chromosome 9p22 found to be associated with high-density lipoprotein (HDL-C), TTC39B was the only one of several genes in the locus to have an eQTL in liver, with the allele associated with decreased expression correlating with increased HDL-C. Knockdown of the mouse ortholog TTC39B via a viral vector (50% knockdown) resulted in significantly higher plasma HDL-C levels at 4 days and 7 days. The data indicates that TTC39B as causal genes for lipid regulation.

References